Welcome to Sweden is a Swedish reality show starring American actors Richard Kiel (known as  Jaws from the James Bond films) and Verne Troyer (known as Mini-Me in the Austin Powers movies). The show aired on Swedish channel 5 in early 2007.

Overview
During the couple of winter days they visit Sweden, Kiel and Troyer get to experience as much of Swedish customs as possible, including celebrating Midsummer's Eve, May Day, a Crayfish party, Gymnasia graduation, Gustavus Adolphus Day, Vasaloppet, opening of Parliament, a trip to Gotland and taking a booze cruise to Finland.

References

External links

 Welcome to Sweden at From Sweden with Love

Kanal 5 (Swedish TV channel) original programming
Swedish reality television series